North Lakes is a suburb in the Moreton Bay Region, Queensland, Australia.

Geography 
The suburb is mostly made up of newly developed housing originally around the North Lakes Golf Course 

Lake Eden is within the suburb of North Lakes. The lake is surrounded by a public park and features many waterbirds and other wildlife. Amenities at the lakeside park include a café, children's playground and walking track.

The North Lakes Business Park is a commercial site situated on the edge of the North Lakes masterplanned community.

Plantation Road Bridge is a  road bridge over the Bruce Highway to linking North Lakes to Dakabin along Plantation Road.

History 
North Lakes is situated in the Yugarabul traditional Indigenous Australian country.

North Lakes State College opened on 1 January 2002.

The Lakes College opened on 24 January 2005.

Originally part of Mango Hill, North Lakes was gazetted as a separate suburb by the Department of Natural Resources, Mines and Water in February 2006. The origin of the suburb name is from the name given to the estate development.

North Lakes Business Park started construction in 2007 and is planned to take more than ten years to fully complete.

Bounty Boulevard State School was opened on 1 January 2009. 

The median age of the North Lakes population was 31 years, 6 years below the national median of 37.  63% of people living in North Lakes were born in Australia. The other top responses for country of birth were England 9.2%, New Zealand 8.7%, South Africa 3.9%, Philippines 1.3%, Scotland 1%. 86.6% of people spoke only English at home; the next most common languages were 1.5% Afrikaans, 0.8% Hindi, 0.7% Tagalog, 0.7% Spanish, 0.5% German.

The North Lakes Library opened in 2014.

Plantation Road Bridge over the Bruce Highway linking North Lakes to Dakabin along Plantation Road opened on 12 December 2014.

North Lakes includes the largest South African Australian community of any suburb in Queensland, numbering 809 individuals and making up 3.7% of the suburb's population.

The North Lakes Golf Club closed on 11 August 2019 with the land to be sold for a retirement village. Residents were upset by the decision as they chose to live in the area because of the green space of the golf course.

Heritage listings 
North Lakes has a number of heritage-listed sites, including:
 Anzac Avenue (the road itself)

Education 

Bounty Boulevard State School is a government primary (Prep-6) school for boys and girls at 195 Bounty Boulevard. In 2018, the school had an enrolment of 1,424 students with 94 teachers (86 full-time equivalent) and 50 non-teaching staff (31 full-time equivalent). It includes a special education program.

North Lakes State College is a government primary and secondary (Prep-12) school for boys and girls at Joyner Circuit. In 2018, the school had an enrolment of 2,947 students with 227 teachers (206 full-time equivalent) and 82 non-teaching staff (61 full-time equivalent). It includes a special education program.

The Lakes College is a private primary and secondary (Prep-12) school for boys and girls at 2 College Street. In 2018, the school had an enrolment of 833 students with 66 teachers (63 full-time equivalent) and 43 non-teaching staff (38 full-time equivalent).

YMCA Vocational School is a private secondary (9-12) facility of YMCA Vocational School at Kingston at 75 Lakefield Drive.

Amenities 
The suburb includes parklands, schools and shops and also many new facilities in the area, including the North Lakes Community Centre, North Lakes Bus Station, industrial estate, and Westfield North Lakes. Major tenants of the shopping centre include Target, Coles, Big W, Woolworths, Myer, Kmart and other major franchises and boutique stores. A cinema complex opened in mid 2016. A 28,000sq m IKEA superstore (the second in Queensland) officially opened on 17 November 2016 as part of Westfield's stage three development. North Lakes is also the site of Queensland's first Costco.

The Moreton Bay Regional Council operates a public library at 10 The Corso.

Axis Church is at 1 Gardenia Parade. It is part of the Wesleyan Methodist Church.

Lifebuilders Church holds Afrikaans-language services at North Lakes Hotel at 22 Lakefield Drive and English-language services at Narangba Valley State School at Narangba. It is part of the Wesleyan Methodist Church.

There are a number of parks in the area:

 Byron Park
 Mackenzie Park

 Settlers Park

Healthcare 
The Queensland Health hub provides dialysis, family health and various other healthcare needs. Additionally, the North Lakes Day Hospital and North Lakes Haematology & Oncology Clinic provide various surgical facilities and medical disciplines. In September 2015, construction was underway on a radiation oncology facility and North Lakes Specialist Medical Centre was completed in 2016.

Transport
The only mode of public transport in North Lakes is bus with all services traveling ether via or to/from North Lakes Bus Station (also known as North Lakes Station) located at 40 Endeavour Boulevard.

The 688 and 689 local loop bus service provides transport throughout the suburb connecting it to other bus services at North Lakes Station. The 687 service runs also does a loop around North Lakes and connects to train services at Mango Hill railway station in the nearby suburb of Mango Hill. Bus routes 681 and 682 provides a connection to Mango Hill with a connection to train services at Mango Hill railway station.  Bus route 668 travels from North Lakes Bus Station to Narangba providing a bus connection to Narangba railway station, route 676 provides connection to Murrumba Downs via Kallangur railway station, route 679 provides connection to Griffin via Murrumba Downs railway station and routes 684 and 685 provides connection to Kallangur traveling to Kallangur railway station. The 680 bus also travels to North Lakes Station providing connections to Redcliffe, Chermside, Petrie and Strathpine.

References

External links

 
 North Lakes Qld Community

 
Suburbs of Moreton Bay Region